The Good Earth is the fifth studio album released by Manfred Mann's Earth Band in 1974. Its opening song is a cover of "Give Me the Good Earth", written by Gary Wright and released on his 1971 solo album Footprint, while tracks 2 and 3 were originally by Australian progressive rock band Spectrum.

Early owners of each copy of The Good Earth were entitled to rights over 1 square foot of the earth situated at Llanerchyrfa in the County of Brecon, in Wales. The inner sleeve included a coupon that had to be sent for registration. This was part of the promotion activities linked to the album that had ecological inspirations. There was no swindle and thousands of fans were registered. Registration could be done on or before 31 December 1975.

The album was on the US Billboard 200 charts for three weeks, peaking at number 157 on 7 December 1974.

Track listing

Side one
"Give Me the Good Earth" (Gary Wright) – 8:31
"Launching Place" (Mike Rudd) – 5:52
"I'll Be Gone" (Rudd) – 3:42

Side two
 "Earth Hymn" (Manfred Mann, Chris Slade) – 6:19
"Sky High" (Mann, Mick Rogers) – 5:15 
"Be Not Too Hard" (Rogers, Christopher Logue) – 4:12   
"Earth Hymn Part 2" (Mann, Slade) – 4:18

Bonus Tracks (1998 CD reissue)
 "Be Not Too Hard" (Single version) (Rogers, Logue) – 3:39   
"I'll Be Gone" (Single Version) (Rudd) – 3:28
"Earth Hymn Part 2a" (Single Version) (Mann, Slade) – 4:13

Personnel

The Earth Band
 Manfred Mann – Hammond organ, piano, Hohner clavinet, Minimoog synthesiser, keyboards
 Mick Rogers – guitars, vocals
 Chris Slade – drums
 Colin Pattenden – bass guitar

Technical
 Manfred Mann's Earth Band – producers
 John Pantry – engineer
 Laurence Latham – assistant engineer
 Linda Glover – design
 Alan Shawcroff – photography

References

External links 
 Manfred Mann's Earth Band - The Good Earth (1974) album releases & credits at Discogs
 Manfred Mann's Earth Band - The Good Earth (1974) album credits & user reviews at ProgArchives.com
 Manfred Mann's Earth Band - The Good Earth (1974) album to be listened on Spotify

Manfred Mann's Earth Band albums
1974 albums
Bronze Records albums
Warner Records albums